Barbatula is a genus of fish in the family Nemacheilidae native to Europe and Asia. They are found in streams, rivers and lakes, and the genus also includes Europe's only cavefish, which only was discovered in the Danube–Aachtopf system in Germany in 2015.

Barbatula formerly included many more species, but these have been moved to other genera, notably Oxynoemacheilus.

Species
There are currently 19 recognized species in this genus:

 Barbatula altayensis S. Q. Zhu, 1992
 Barbatula barbatula (Linnaeus, 1758)
 Barbatula cobdonensis (Gundrizer, 1973)
 Barbatula conilobus Prokofiev, 2016
 Barbatula dgebuadzei (Prokofiev, 2003)
 Barbatula dsapchynensis Prokofiev, 2016
 Barbatula golubtsovi (Prokofiev, 2003)
 Barbatula markakulensis (Men'shikov, 1939) 
 Barbatula minxianensis (X. T. Wang & S. Q. Zhu, 1979)
 Barbatula nuda (Bleeker, 1864)
 Barbatula oreas (D. S. Jordan & Fowler, 1903)
 Barbatula potaninorum (Prokofiev, 2007)
 Barbatula quignardi (Băcescu-Meşter, 1967)
 Barbatula restricta Prokofiev, 2015
 Barbatula sawadai (Prokofiev, 2007)
 Barbatula sturanyi (Steindachner, 1892)
 Barbatula tomiana (Ruzsky (ru), 1920)
 Barbatula toni (Dybowski, 1869)
 Barbatula zetensis (Šorić, 2000)

References

 
Fish of Asia
Freshwater fish genera
Nemacheilidae
Taxonomy articles created by Polbot